Saint-Exupéry may refer to:

People
 Antoine de Saint-Exupéry, aviation pioneer and writer, author of The Little Prince
 Consuelo de Saint Exupéry, writer, artist, and wife of Antoine de Saint-Exupéry
 Marie-Madeleine de Saint-Exupéry (1897–1927), writer, sister of Antoine de Saint-Exupéry
 Simone de Saint-Exupéry (1898–1978), writer, sister of Antoine de Saint-Exupéry
 Saint Exuperius, early fifth-century bishop of Toulouse

Other
 2578 Saint-Exupéry, asteroid named in honour of Antoine de Saint-Exupéry
 Aguja Saint Exupery, mountain in Patagonia, Argentina, named in honour of Antoine de Saint-Exupéry 
 Château Malescot St. Exupéry, Bordeaux wine producer archaically named simply St.-Exupéry
 Lyon-Saint Exupéry Airport (formerly Satolas), Lyon, France, named in honour of Antoine de Saint-Exupéry
 Gare de Lyon Saint-Exupéry (formerly Gare de Satolas), the high-speed railway station located at the airport
 Saint-Exupéry, Gironde, commune of the Gironde département, in France
 A novel about Antoine de Saint-Exupéry by Alyson Richman
 ex-Saint Exupéry, alternative name for the Firebird Stradivarius